Ko Stijger (1 May 1915 – 31 December 1997) was a Dutch footballer. He played in two matches for the Netherlands national football team from 1940 to 1946.

References

External links
 

1915 births
1997 deaths
Dutch footballers
Netherlands international footballers
Place of birth missing
Association footballers not categorized by position